The Las Vegas Showgirlz were a team in the Women's Football Alliance.  Based in Summerlin, Nevada, the Showgirlz played their home games on the campus of Faith Lutheran Jr/Sr High School in the city's upscale Summerlin district.

Before joining the WFA, the Showgirlz played two seasons in the Women's Professional Football League and one in the Independent Women's Football League.

Season-By-Season 

|-
| colspan="6" align="center" | Las Vegas Showgirlz (WPFL)
|-
|2006 || 2 || 5 || 0 || 4th American West || --
|-
|2007 || 2 || 6 || 0 || 4th American West || --
|-
| colspan="6" align="center" | Las Vegas Showgirlz (IWFL)
|-
|2008 || 5 || 3 || 0 || 2nd Pacific Southwest || --
|-
| colspan="6" align="center" | Las Vegas Showgirlz (WFA)
|-
|2009 || 8 || 1 || 0 || 1st American Pacific || Lost American Conference Semifinal (St. Louis)
|-
|2010 || 10 || 2 || 0 || T-1st American South Pacific || Won American Conference Quarterfinal (Portland)Won American Conference Semifinal (Austin)Lost American Conference Championship (Lone Star)
|-
|2011 || 4 || 6 || 0 || 3rd American South Pacific || --
|-
|2012* || -- || -- || -- || -- || --
|-
!Totals || 31 || 23 || 0
|colspan="2"| (including playoffs)

2009

Season schedule

2010

Season schedule

2011

Standings

Season schedule

* = Exhibition
** = Won by forfeit

2012

Season schedule

External links 
Las Vegas Showgirlz official website

Women's Football Alliance teams
American football teams in the Las Vegas Valley
American football teams established in 2006
2006 establishments in Nevada
Summerlin, Nevada
Women's sports in Nevada